The Ambassador of the Soviet Union is a 1969 Soviet drama film directed by Georgy Natanson.

Plot 
The film tells about a woman named Yelena Koltsova, the prototype of which was Alexandra Kollontai (the first woman ambassador in world history).

Cast 
 Yuliya Borisova as Ambassador Yelena Nikolayevna Koltsova
 Anatoly Ktorov as the King
 Gunārs Cilinskis as Julius Helmer, financier (voiced by Yury Yakovlev)
 Voldemar Panso as minister of "neighboring country"
 Helmut Vaag as daddy Gunar, fisherman
 Ants Eskola as foreign minister of the kingdom (voiced by Yefim Kopelyan)
 Yevgeniya Kozyreva as Kristina Sorenson
 Yuri Puzyryov as Ivan Nikitich Morozov
 Nikolai Timofeyev as Georgy Aleksandrovich Klimov
 Ada Lundver as Countess Runge, Helmer's sister
Ants Lauter as King's dignitary

References

External links 
 

1969 films
1960s Russian-language films
Soviet drama films
1969 drama films